In a Lonely Place is a 1947 novel by mystery writer Dorothy B. Hughes. Nicholas Ray directed a classic film noir under the same title, starring Humphrey Bogart and Gloria Grahame, in 1950.

Synopsis
In post World War II Los Angeles, Dix Steele is an ex-airman who roams the city at night. He offers to help a police detective friend, Brub, solve the case of a serial killer—risking revealing that he himself has strangled women on a monthly basis since arriving in LA. Eventually, actress Laurel Gray and Brub's wife Sylvia become suspicious of Dix and they aid the forces of justice to close in on the killer without him being aware of it.

Book to film
The film differs from the novel in several substantial ways. Mostly notably, in the film, despite being a violent man with a hot temper, Steele is innocent of the murders he's suspected of committing, and is sincere in his desire to be a successful screenwriter; in the novel, he is a misogynistic,  sociopathic killer who claims to be a crime novel writer in order to sponge off of a wealthy uncle.

Radio adaptation
Philip Morris Playhouse presented In a Lonely Place March 16, 1952. Joseph Cotten and University of Kansas student Mary Lou Jukes co-starred in the 30-minute adaptation.

Suspense presented In a Lonely Place March 6, 1948. Robert Montgomery and Lurene Tuttle starred in a one-hour adaptation of the full plot.

References 

1947 American novels
American crime novels
American novels adapted into films
Novels adapted into radio programs
Novels set in Los Angeles
Hardboiled crime novels